The 2014 Trofeo Città di Brescia was a professional tennis tournament played on carpet courts. It was the first edition of the tournament which is part of the 2014 ATP Challenger Tour. It took place in Brescia, Italy between November 10 and November 16, 2014.

Singles main-draw entrants

Seeds

 1 Rankings are as of November 3, 2014.

Other entrants
The following players received wildcards into the singles main draw:
  Filippo Baldi
  Salvatore Caruso
  Pietro Licciardi
  Gianluca Mager

The following players received entry from the qualifying draw:
  Andrés Artuñedo
  Mirza Bašić
  Konstantin Kravchuk
  Denis Matsukevich

The following player received entry by an alternate spot:
  Daniel Gimeno Traver

The following player received entry by a protected ranking:
  Sergei Bubka

Champions

Singles

  Illya Marchenko def.  Farrukh Dustov, 6–4, 5–7, 6–2

Doubles

  Illya Marchenko /  Denys Molchanov def.  Roman Jebavý /  Błażej Koniusz, 7–6(7–4), 6–3

External links
Official Website 

Trofeo Citta di Brescia
Trofeo Città di Brescia
Trofeo Citta di Brescia